Love at Stake is a 1987 American comedy film, directed by John C. Moffitt, based on a screenplay by Lanier Laney and Terry Sweeney. It stars Patrick Cassidy and Kelly Preston, with Barbara Carrera, Bud Cort, Dave Thomas, and Stuart Pankin. Joyce Brothers makes a cameo appearance as herself.

The film is an obvious spoof of the infamous Salem witch trials, moving in the vein of anarchic comedy films like Mel Brooks' Blazing Saddles and others by Monty Python and Zucker, Abrahams and Zucker.

The film was produced by Hemdale Film Corporation and was distributed by Tri-Star Pictures. Filming took place in Kleinburg, Ontario.

Plot
In 1692, Miles Campbell, recent graduate of Harvard Divinity School, arrives in Salem, Massachusetts to become the local parson's assistant. He meets with his childhood sweetheart, baker Sara Lee, and plans to marry her. Meanwhile, greedy Judge Samuel John arrives to meet with idiotic Mayor Upton to discuss plans for a (anachronistic) Mall for Salem. To acquire the necessary real estate they hatch a scheme to accuse certain villagers of witchcraft. When the accused are tried, convicted and burned, their land can be confiscated. The plan is succeeding, as the villagers, egged on by the parson's shrewish mother, enthusiastically accept the Judge's message. Then saucy Faith Stewart (secretly a real witch) arrives from London for Thanksgiving with her cousins. Faith falls for Miles and accuses Sara of witchcraft. Miles must prove Sara's innocence before she is burned at the stake.

Cast
Patrick Cassidy as Miles Campbell
Kelly Preston as Sara Lee
Georgia Brown as Widow Chastity
Barbara Carrera as Faith Stewart
Bud Cort as Parson Babcock
Annie Golden as Abigail Baxter, Faith's cousin
David Graf as Nathaniel Baxter, her husband
Audrie J. Neenan as Mrs. Babcock, the parson's mother
Stuart Pankin as Judge Samuel John
Dave Thomas as Mayor Upton
Anne Ramsey as Old Witch
Mary Hawkins as Mrs. Priscilla Upton
Jackie Mahon as Belinda Upton, the mayor's daughter
Norma MacMillan as Aunt Deliverance Jones, Sara's aunt
Joyce Brothers as herself
Colleen Karney as Adulteress
Juul Haalmeyer as Executioner
Julian Richings as Town Crier
Danny Higham as Newsboy
Marshall Perlmuter as Mr. Newberry
Anna Ferguson as Mrs. Newberry
Catharine Gallant as Constance Van Buren
Jayne Eastwood as Annabelle Porter
Nick Ramus as Chief Wannatoka

References

External links

Aisle Seat review
The Unknown Movies review
The Serious Comedy Site review

1987 films
1980s parody films
1987 independent films
American independent films
American parody films
American satirical films
TriStar Pictures films
Films scored by Charles Fox
Films shot in Ontario
Films set in the 1690s
1987 directorial debut films
1987 comedy films
1980s English-language films
Films directed by John Moffitt
1980s American films